Echinosaura orcesi is a species of lizard in the family Gymnophthalmidae. The species is endemic to northwestern South America.

Etymology
The specific name, orcesi, is in honor of Ecuadorian herpetologist Gustavo Orcés.

Geographic range
E. orcesi is found in Colombia and Ecuador.

Habitat
The natural habitats of E. orcesi are forest and wetland.

Reproduction
E. orcesi is oviparous.

References

Further reading
Castro-Herrera, Fernando; Vargas-Salinas, Fernando (2008). "Anfibios y reptiles en el departamento del Valle del Cauca, Colombia ". Biota Colombiana 9 (2): 251–277. (in Spanish, with an abstract in English).
Valencia-Zuleta, Alejandro; Jaramillo-Martínez, Andrés Felipe; Echeverry-Bocanegra, Andrea; Viáfara-Vega, Ronald; Hernández-Córdoba, Oscar; Cardona-Botero, Victoria E.; Gutiérrez-Zúñiga, Jaime; Castro-Herrera, Fernando (2014). "Conservation status of the herpetofauna, protected areas, and current problems in Valle del Cauca, Colombia". Amphibian & Reptile Conservation 8 (2) [Special Section]: 1–18; S1-S24 (e87). (in English, with an abstract in Spanish).

Echinosaura
Lizards of South America
Reptiles of Colombia
Reptiles of Ecuador
Reptiles described in 2002
Taxa named by Thomas H. Fritts
Taxa named by Ana de Lourdes Almendáriz Cabeza
Taxa named by Sissi Samec